Søyr (established 1976 in Trondheim, Norway) is a Norwegian musical group, led from the start of
trumpeter Torgrim Sollid.

Biography 
Søyr was initially inspired by folk music from Stor-Elvdal (among others Ole Mørk Sandvik) and released the album Søyr (1977) and Cierny Peter (1983), and performed at Kongsberg Jazzfestival 1977. The band is still active, and was involved on tour in South Africa in the summer of 2004. The Free State «Søyr» was established in Moldejazz 1997.

The band moved (with leader Sollid) to Oslo and assumed a more avant-garde style with a big band flair. Dag Arnesen was in the lineup 1981–82, and also Kenny Wheeler played within Søyr for four years. «Nye Søyr» released compositions by Vidar Johansen, Rune Klakegg, Torgrim Sollid, Rob Waring and Jon Balke på platen Vectors (1988) with the original lineup. Then came the 25-year anniversary with a new album Alene hjemme (2001).

Original lineup 
Elin Rosseland - vocals
Tove Karoline Knutsen - vocals (album 1)
Torgrim Sollid - trumpet (album 1)
Åge Midtgård - trumpet (album 1)
John Pål Inderberg - soprano saxophone & tenor saxophone (album 1)
Ove Stokstad - soprano saxophone, tenor saxophone & baritone saxophone (album 1)
Tore Engstrøm - alto saxophone (album 1)
Nils Tro - tenor saxophone (album 1)
Tor A. Ramstad - baritone saxophone
Jan Andresen - saxophones and bass clarinet
Nils Jansen - saxophones and bass clarinet
Per Gamre - trombone (album 1)
Bodil Vossgård - cello
Rob Waring - vibraphone and percussion
Morten Lassem - piano (album 1)
Rune Klakegg - piano and synth
Bjørn Alterhaug - double bass (album 1)
Tor Mathisrud - double bass
Carl Haakon Waadeland - drums (album 1)
Frank Jakobsen - drums
Tom Olstad - drums

New members 
Edvard Askeland - bass (album 2 & 3)
Eldbjørg Raknes - vocals (1994–96)
Morten Halle - saxophone (album 2 & 3)
Vidar Johansen - saxophone (1991–)
Astrid Kvalbein - vocals (album 3)
Christian Jaksjø - trombone (album 3)
Guro Gravem Johansen - vocals (album 3)
Knut Aalefjær - drums and percussion
Per Einar Watle - guitar
Erling Aksdal - piano
Børge Petersen-Øverleir - guitar
Torstein Lofthus - drums

Discography 
1977: Søyr (MAI 7705)
1983: Cierny Peter (Odin LP 12), recorded live at Stavanger Jazz Club.
1987: Vectors (Hot Club Records)
1994: Bussene lengter hjem (Curling Legs)
1997: Med kjøtt og kjærlighet (Curling Legs), with the poetry of Niels Fredrik Dahl and Torgeir Rebolledo Pedersen
2001: Alene hjemme (Curling Legs)

References

Norwegian jazz ensembles
Big bands
Spellemannprisen winners
ECM Records artists
Musical groups established in 1976
1976 establishments in Norway
Musical groups from Trondheim